Pokrovka is a rural locality (a village) in Pereborskoye Rural Settlement, Beryozovsky District, Perm Krai, Russia. The population was 163 as of 2010. There are 6 streets.

Geography 
It is located on the Shakva River.

References 

Rural localities in Beryozovsky District, Perm Krai